Ashure, Noah's pudding or trigo koço is a sweet pudding of Eastern Mediterranean origin that is made of a mixture consisting of various types of grains, fresh and dried fruits, and nuts. 

Armenians make it as a Christmas pudding and for New Year's celebrations, where it is a centerpiece, and in the Balkans and Turkey, Sufi Muslims make the dish during the month of Muharram in which the Day of Ashure takes place. Sephardic Jews prepare the dish to celebrate the Jewish holiday of Tu BiShvat. In some Jewish, Christian, and Muslim traditions, a similar dish is prepared to commemorate a child's first tooth, or the passing of a family member.

Ashure was traditionally made and eaten during the colder months of the year due to its heavy and calorie rich nature, but now it is enjoyed year-round. The dish is traditionally made in large quantities and is distributed to friends, relatives, neighbors, colleagues, classmates, and others, without regard to the recipient's religion or belief system as an offering of peace and love.

History and traditions

Earliest origins 
For the people of the ancient Near East, foods composed of boiled whole grains came to be associated with spring and harvest rites since ancient times. This association spread to Asia, Europe, and Africa. Rites related with Tammuz, the Babylonian god of wheat and fertility, were recorded as late as the 10th century by an Arab traveler who wrote about boiled heat among the dishes consumed at a pagan celebration held at Harran.

Jews, Christians and Muslims have all consumed boiled wheat in a variety of ways under various names for millennia. These dishes have been sweetened in various ways with sugar, fruit molasses, and dried fruits. Although they are connected to Abrahamic religious holidays like the tenth day of Muharram, Christmas, Lent, Easter, and Tu BiShvat, as well as occasions like a child's first tooth or a family member's passing, their roots can be traced back to fertility and rebirth rituals used by early farmers in the Near East.

Turkey 
According to one tradition, it is claimed that when the ark came to rest on Mount Ararat, the family of Nuh or Noah celebrated with a special dish. Since their supplies were nearly exhausted, what was left (primarily grains, dried fruits and the like) was cooked together to form a pudding, what is now called ashure.

Turkish families make ashure pudding to commemorate this event. Ashure is distributed to the poor, as well as to neighbors, friends and relatives. Evliya Çelebi says in his travelbook Seyahatname that "Ashure is a porridge (as) that should be cooked on the tenth of Muharram."

According to a late Ottoman writer, passages from the Koran were spoken over the cauldron of cooked aşure in memory of deceased family members before it was served to neighbors, suggesting that for certain Sunni families the meal had a connection to remembering the deceased.

Even today, a dish akin to this is prepared to honor a child's first tooth. According to the Ottoman historian Ahmed Cavid (d. 1803), women gave this away to loved ones, friends, and the impoverished as a gesture of gratitude for the child's survival of the difficult first year of life. In Turkey and many other Middle Eastern countries, this tradition is still common among Christians, Jews, and Muslims. The dish can be either sweet or savory and is known in Greek as kofyas and in Turkish as diş buday ('tooth wheat').

Aşure is also made during the Hıdırellez spring celebration, which is the occasion where it is most similar to its ancient pagan roots.

The Balkans 
This dish is prepared in Bosnia and Bulgaria under the names hašure and ashoure, respectively.

Armenia 
In Armenia, ashure may be garnished with pomegranate seeds and flavored with rose water, and the pudding is shared with neighbors during the Christmas season. The festive pudding is the centerpiece of the New Year's table, which is often decorated with dried fruits, nuts and pomegranates.

Jewish cuisine 
Sephardic Jews prepare Ashure for the Jewish holiday of Tu BiShvat. The dish is also referred to as "trigo koço". It is made out of boiling wheat grains combined with sugar, crushed walnuts, and cinnamon. According to Aylin Öney Tan, this practice may have originated from early Jewish communities in Anatolia during the Byzantine era rather than being brought to Ottoman Turkey by Sephardic Jews who immigrated there in the late 15th century. Also, several Jewish communities make it to celebrate a child's first tooth.

Ingredients 
Ashure porridge does not have a single recipe, as recipes vary between regions and families.

Traditionally, it is said to have at least seven ingredients. Some say at least ten ingredients must be used, in keeping with the theme of "tenth", while Alevis always use twelve. Among these are wheat, barley, rice, white beans, chickpeas, pekmez, date molasses, pomegranate molasses, beet juice, dried fruits like dates, raisins, currants, apricots, figs, apples and nuts like pistachios, almonds, hazelnuts, walnuts, pine nuts and sesame seeds. However, many renditions add orange, lemon and lime peel to add depth to the pudding. Anise seed, black cumin seeds, prunus mahaleb, pomegranate arils, cardamom, cinnamon, cloves, nutmeg and allspice may be used as garnish, and some variations are flavored with anise liqueur, rose water and/or orange blossom water.

Etymology 
The word Ashure comes from the Arabic word "Ashura", meaning 'tenth'.

See also 
 Ashoriya, grains and cereals are eaten in remembrance for the drowned people of Noah's flood in Mandaeism.

References

External links 

 Annual Noah's Pudding Day

Turkish puddings
Macedonian cuisine
Fruit dishes
Christmas food
Food and drink in Islam
New Year foods
Noah
Armenian desserts
Bulgarian desserts
Mount Ararat
Christmas traditions in Europe
Albanian cuisine
Mandaean ceremonial food and drink
Sephardi Jewish cuisine